Sindri Assembly constituency   is an assembly constituency in  the Indian state of Jharkhand.

Members of Assembly 
2005: Raj Kishore Mahato, Bharatiya Janata Party
2009: Phul Chand Mandal, Jharkhand Vikas Morcha (Prajatantrik)
2014: Phul Chand Mandal, Bharatiya Janata Party
2019: Indrajit Mahato, Bharatiya Janata Party

See also
Vidhan Sabha
List of states of India by type of legislature

References

Assembly constituencies of Jharkhand